Kommunistische Montags-Zeitung ('Communist Monday Newspaper') was a weekly newspaper published by the Greater Berlin District of the Communist Workers Party of Germany 1920–1921. It was published instead of Kommunistische Arbeiter-Zeitung (KAZ) on Mondays. Kunze, who also edited KAZ, edited the newspaper.

References

1920 establishments in Germany
1921 disestablishments in Germany
Defunct newspapers published in Germany
German-language communist newspapers
Newspapers published in Berlin
Publications disestablished in 1921
Newspapers established in 1920
Defunct weekly newspapers